2011 State Basketball League season may refer to:

2011 MSBL season, Men's SBL season
2011 WSBL season, Women's SBL season